The 2016 CS Golden Spin of Zagreb was the 49th edition of the annual senior-level international figure skating competition held in Zagreb, Croatia. It was held at the Dom sportova in December 2016 as part of the 2016–17 ISU Challenger Series. Medals were awarded in the disciplines of men's singles, ladies' singles, pair skating, and ice dancing.

Entries

 Added
 Men: Franz Streubel (GER), Michael Christian Martinez (PHI)
 Ladies: Katarina Kulgeyko (ISR), Ashley Wagner (USA), Karen Chen (USA)
 Pairs: Natalja Zabijako / Alexander Enbert (RUS), Deanna Stellato / Nathan Bartholomay (USA)
 Ice dance: Shari Koch / Christian Nüchtern (GER)

 Withdrew before starting orders drawn
 Men: Alexei Mialiokhin (BLR), Yakau Zenko (BLR), Micah Tang (TPE), Michal Březina (CZE), Tomi Pulkkinen (FIN), Matthias Versluis (FIN), Kai Xiang Chew (MAS), Adam Rippon (USA)
 Ladies: Anastasia Galustyan (ARM), Amy Lin (TPE), Alina Suponenko (BLR), Katarina Kitarović (CRO), Anni Järvenpää (FIN), Jenni Saarinen (FIN), Netta Schreiber (ISR), Elizabet Tursynbayeva (KAZ), Diāna Ņikitina (LAT), Fleur Maxwell (LUX), Monika Peterka (SLO), Choi Da-bin (KOR), Isabelle Olsson (SWE), Polina Edmunds (USA), Ashley Wagner (USA)
 Pairs: Natalja Zabijako / Alexander Enbert (RUS), Kim Kyu-eun / Alex Kang-chan Kam (KOR), Tarah Kayne / Daniel O'Shea
 Ice dance: Viktoria Kavaliova / Yurii Bieliaiev (BLR), Olesia Karmi / Max Lindholm (FIN), Katharina Müller / Tim Dieck (GER), Jasmine Tessari / Francesco Fioretti (ITA), Alexandra Stepanova / Ivan Bukin (RUS), Lucie Myslivečková / Lukáš Csölley (SVK), Robynne Tweedale / Joseph Buckland (GBR)

Results

Men

Ladies

Pairs

Ice dancing

References

External links
 2016 CS Golden Spin of Zagreb at the International Skating Union
 Croatian Skating Federation

CS Golden Spin of Zagreb
2016 in Croatian sport